Svobodní, until 2019 known as the Party of Free Citizens or the Free Citizens' Party, is a classical liberal and right-libertarian, Eurosceptic political party in the Czech Republic founded in 2009 by Petr Mach, an economist and professor of macroeconomics. Before assuming his position as an MEP, Mach taught economics at VŠFS and VŠEM (two private business colleges in Prague). The party is led by Libor Vondráček.

Svobodní participated in the 2009 European Parliament election in the Czech Republic. Its platform called for a referendum on the introduction of the euro in the Czech Republic and the rejection of the Treaty of Lisbon. The party unsuccessfully negotiated with Declan Ganley to join his European Union-wide Libertas movement. Its symbol is the outline of a ram's horns in green. After the 2014 European Parliament election, the party's MEP joined the Europe of Freedom and Direct Democracy (EFDD) group. Party is member of the International Alliance of Libertarian Parties and Interlibertarians.

Several county councilors successfully ran on the party's ballot in the 2010 local elections as thirty-eight councilors held positions, primarily in towns and small cities. The party fielded candidates in the 2014 local elections, increasing its number of councilors. There are elected councilors in city districts (Prague 3, Prague 18 and Brno-Slatina) and towns (Chrudim, Hodonín and Kutná Hora).

Philosophy 

The party may be described as libertarian, opposing high government involvement in the economy and personal lives and the centralization of political power. Its free market advocates often adhere to the Austrian School of economics. They aim to lower tax rates, restrict state redistribution of wealth as much as possible and introduce a constitutional amendment forbidding an unbalanced budget. The party believes that downsizing the government would leave less opportunity for corruption, a problematic issue in Czech politics. They also say that Czech sovereignty is indispensable for a true democratic system and they see the respect for state free-making decisions as an analogy of respect for human freedom.

Membership 

Party membership consists primarily of minarchists, anarcho-capitalists, right-wing libertarians and conservative libertarians. There are two types of membership, namely full members and registered supporters. Although both may vote and contest primary elections, only members can elect the party leadership.

The elected Republic Leadership (Republikove predsednictvo) consists of one president and four vice-presidents. They have a common responsibility for the party and with the help of the council they make statements and direct its political affairs. After every Chamber of Deputies election (the lower house of the Czech parliament), new party leadership is elected.

The Regional Councils (Krajske predsednictvo), corresponding to the Czech Republic's 14 districts, approve new members and allocate funds for local campaigns. The Republic Council (Republikovy vybor), consisting of 28 elected members, the Republic Leadership and the Regional Council heads, make administrative decisions.

Symbol and colors 
The party's primary color, British racing green symbolizes freedom. According to Petr Mach, "[f]reedom is a lifestyle". Its secondary color, manganese purple (RGB 108, 36, 123), is shared with sister party Liberalistene in Norway and the UK Independence Party (its main European ally). The ram symbolizes the party's stubborn defensive position towards all attempts to suppress freedom.

Electorate 
According to most Czech media, the largest portion of the party's voters are dissatisfied with the Civic Democratic Party's (ODS) lack of Euroscepticism and national conservatism. Many are followers of former ODS leader Václav Klaus, who became president of the country. A minority are former TOP 09, Green Party or US-DEU voters. A large number are first-time voters. Occasional support is exchanged with the Czech Pirate Party.

Party support in student elections is from four to eight percent. Apprentices and industrial high schools lead grammar schools and private schools which does not correlate with the adult vote. Voters are mostly college graduates, irreligious, middle-class, live in larger cities and work in IT or economics. The party's stronghold has traditionally been Prague. It is also popular in cities with lower unemployment, such as České Budějovice, Liberec, Hradec Králové, Brno and Zlín. The party is also popular with small business owners and organizes demonstrations at tax offices for lower taxation.

Autumn 2014 polls predicted party success in Prague and larger Bohemian cities such as Mladá Boleslav, České Budějovice, Pardubice and Hradec Králové which would attract about five percent of the vote. However, this did not happen and the party received about 3.5 percent of the vote.

Election results 

The party regularly contests major elections, whose candidates are chosen in an Internet primary by members and registered supporters. This system, unique in Czech politics, creates a platform reflecting voter mood.

Chamber of Deputies 
The party has contested four elections to the Chamber of Deputies, the lower house of Parliament.

Results indicated increased support in the 2013 election (which was held seven months early due to the right-wing government collapse after the Prime Minister Petr Nečas) as many voters sought alternatives to right-wing politics. The party did best in Prague, Central Bohemia, the Pilsen region and Zlín.

The election cost the party about four million Kč. Since every party crossing the 1.5 percent threshold receives its deposit and extra, one-time state-funding, the party received about 13 million Kč. This made it the second-most-effective party in terms of cost per vote.

European Parliament 

The European elections are significant as the party is the most dominant hard-line Eurosceptic party in the country. These elections have a very low turnout (one of the lowest in the European Union) which aids the party. In the 2014 election, party leader Petr Mach received a seat in the European parliament.

European Union and Euroscepticism 
The party is sceptical about the European Union, and does not see a way to reform what it sees as a bureaucratic colossus; however, it does not emphasize nationalism and does not oppose the European Union for that reason.

Footnotes

External links
 Official page (in Czech)

 
2009 establishments in the Czech Republic
Classical liberal parties
Eurosceptic parties in the Czech Republic
Liberal conservative parties in the Czech Republic
Libertarian conservative parties
Libertarian parties in the Czech Republic
Libertarianism in the Czech Republic
National conservative parties
Paleolibertarianism
Political parties established in 2009
Right-libertarianism
Right-wing parties in the Czech Republic
Civic Democratic Party (Czech Republic) breakaway groups